Winnipeg Transit is the public transit agency, and the bus-service provider, of the City of Winnipeg, Manitoba. Established  years ago, it is owned by the city government and currently employs nearly 1,600 people—including approximately 1,100 bus drivers.

Operating 640 low-floor easy-access buses to more than 5,000 bus stops within the city limits, Winnipeg Transit carries almost 170,000 passengers on an average weekday. Moreover, according to the 2016 Census, public transit was the main mode of commuting for 13.6% of the Winnipeg census metropolitan area.

History (1882–1971)

1882–99: Winnipeg Street Railway Company 
The first attempt to provide public transportation in Winnipeg would, evidently, be premature. On 19 July 1877, a horse-drawn omnibus operated between the Old Customs Building at Main Street & McDermot and Point Douglas. This was only a singly-day attempt and turned out to be a failure.

Nonetheless, four years later, Toronto businessman Albert William Austin recognized the need for public transit in the rapidly-growing city of Winnipeg, and incorporated the Winnipeg Street Railway Company. Soon after, upon prodding the begrudged City Council, Austin was able to establish the Winnipeg Street Railway (WSR) on 27 May 1882, under an agreement that required one mile of track to be laid within 6 months.

Surely enough, Austin met the deadline: the first horsecar made a trial run on 20 October 1882, and regular public service began the next day with four cars. The first route ran along Main Street, from the City Hall to Fort Garry (Broadway and Main St). The next year, the service was extended to run a track along Portage Avenue, and the first car ran along the new tracks to Kennedy Street on 11 November.

Located on Assiniboine Avenue between Main Street and Fort Street, the Company's stable had shelter for the horses, though the cars had to stay out on the rails. Fares were CA$0.10 cash per ride—or 15 tickets for $1.00. (In the winter, fares dropped to $0.05 cash.)

The WSR experimented with electric cars in 1891. On January 28 that year, at 7:30 in the evening near Osborne and Jubilee, the city's first electric car was tested. (That first electric car would be the first Edison car to be manufactured and operated in all of Canada.) The summer of 1882, the Company began running in regular service.

On 1 February 1892, Austin's competitors, William Mackenzie and James Ross of Montreal, received the exclusive right to operate electric street car service in Winnipeg, via city by-law 543. That year, on July 26, Mackenzie and Ross ran the City's first electric street car on Main Street, thereby establishing the Winnipeg Electric Street Railway Company (WESR). Passengers on that first trip included Mayor Hugh John Macdonald and the City Council, among others.

The width of Winnipeg's main streets allowed both companies to operate simultaneously.

Hurting WSR even more was a disastrous fire in 1893, in which the Company lost 68 horses. In court, Austin tried to fight for exclusive rights for street railways, going all the way to the Privy Council in London. In 1894, after losing his case, he sold almost all of the company's assets to the WESR for $175,000, and the two companies agreed to amalgamate on April 28.

Horsecar operations ended the next day, except for the Kennedy Street line, which City Council required to operate for another 6 weeks. Austin additionally kept the Elm Park horsecar line to operate as a private venture; his company had opened the Park in the 1890s to drum up business on the line during off-peak times. With the ending of a price war between the two companies, fares doubled, from 50 up to 25 tickets for  $1.00, or $0.05 cash.

The WESR continued to expand its lines, its inventory of rolling stock, and its car barns. It bought the Manitoba Electric & Gas Light Company for $400,000 in 1898, and changed line voltage from 250 to the standard 550 volts the following year.

1904–24: Winnipeg Electric Railway 

The Winnipeg General Power Company was incorporated by officers of the Winnipeg Electric Street Railway Company (WESR) in 1902. The two companies amalgamated in 1904, adopting a new name for the combined organization: Winnipeg Electric Railway Company (WER), and now controlled all street railway, electric power, and gas utilities in the City.

Incorporated on 1 March 1902, the Suburban Rapid Transit Company operated west of Winnipeg along Portage Avenue, inaugurating a line as far as Charleswood in 1903, and extending to 'Lot 112 St. Charles' in October 1904. Initially leasing cars and buying power from the WESR, the Company was bought up by the amalgamated WER in 1905, which finished expansion of its line to the village of Headingley by the end of the year.

The Winnipeg, Selkirk & Lake Winnipeg Railway, an interurban electric transit company incorporated in 1900, operated cars from the WESR's Main Street terminal to the Town of Selkirk, with a later spur line from West St Paul to Stonewall. In 1906, its stock was bought by the WESR, although it continued to operate as an independent company (to be spun off much later as Beaver Bus Lines).

Also in 1906, a hydroelectric plant was completed in Pinawa, Manitoba, and streetcars started operating on Sundays, following a June 28 plebiscite with 2,891 for and 1,647 against the 'Sunday streetcar' bylaw.

The Company did well during the economic boom of the early 1900s, and built a new headquarters in the eleven-storey Electric Railway Chambers building at Notre Dame Avenue and Albert Street in 1911–1913. The Company occupied the basement and the first two floors and leased out the remaining space to other tenants.

In 1914, the Public Utilities Commission ordered the WER to start collecting fares on a pay-as-you-enter (PAYE) system, which required some rebuilding of cars. PAYE was implemented beginning on 27 May 1914. From 1914 to 1915, the WER would start to experience competition from jitneys, privately owned taxi cabs. The financial pressures of this competition, tensions with the Public Utilities Commission about route planning, complaints regarding the poor state of rolling stock all led to a crisis in 1918. Negotiations with the city led to a repealing of the jitney bylaw, some route changes, a program of rebuilding old trolley cars, and the first appearance of motor buses in Winnipeg.

On 1 May 1918, Winnipeg saw its first gasoline-powered bus in operation.

The Company was also affected by the Winnipeg General Strike of 1919. On June 21, or "Bloody Saturday," strikers set on-fire Streetcar 596, which was run by non-union WER staff members.

A terrible explosion and fire at the Main Street car barn on April 7, 1920, after which some replacement rolling stock was bought from the Twin City Rapid Transit Company of Minneapolis (most of the WER's stock had been built by the company in Winnipeg, or by the Ottawa Car Company).

The Winnipeg Electric Railway Co. took out a full-page ad in September 1920, titled "That The Public May Know The Facts", to state the Company's side of being forced by the Public Utilities Commission and the City of Winnipeg to remove their tracks in the north city-limits area.

In 1921 it also bought some Birney Safety Cars from Preston Car & Coach, which would start service in 1923 after delays caused by controversy over the safety of the one-man cars. Increasing competition with the automobile and the post-war economic slump led to the company rebuilding the rest of its own fleet as one-man cars.

1924–53: Winnipeg Electric Company 
On March 13, 1924, the Manitoba Legislature passed a Bill changing the company's name to the Winnipeg Electric Company (WECo). The Company was allowed to increase its number of Board members from 9 to 12.

On 21 November 1938, WECo started the first modern trolleybus service in Western Canada, on Winnipeg's Sargent Avenue, using 6 vehicles on a  route. Between 1939 and 1945, as many male streetcar operators had volunteered to fight in the Second World War, female operators took over. At the peak, there were 53 women employed as drivers and maintenance workers for public transit. The trolleybus fleet and system were expanded during and after World War II, reaching a peak of 162 vehicles and 70 route miles (110 kilometres) from 1956–1959.

In January 1940, William Carter was named the new President of WECo.

During the summer of 1948, a Public Utility Board inquiry took place questioning the depreciation costs claimed by WECo. and its predecessors on streetcar equipment. This led to a difference of $495,000, part of which WECo. overclaimed $363,504, overestimated $30,000 for snow removal costs, and didn't include a $99,000 "saving" on conversion to trolleybuses.

The River Avenue bus route was extended and its name changed to Crescent in October 1949 after a six-month battle over the routing.

1953–60: Greater Winnipeg Transit Commission 
A referendum was conducted on 25 March 1953, where only the electorate in the city proper were eligible to vote. It turned out that the privately-owned Winnipeg Electric Company (WECo) did not want to operate the transit system any longer. An editorial in the Winnipeg Tribune said:In the Referendum on Wednesday, Winnipeg electors stated emphatically that they want the mass transit facilities of the metropolitan area owned and operated by the people of Greater Winnipeg.As result, within a month of the referendum, the multi-municipality Greater Winnipeg Transit Commission (GWTC) was created through legislation passed by the Manitoba Legislature—the Greater Winnipeg Transit Commission Act, which was proclaimed into law, effective 1 May 1953. As result, on May 29, the Manitoba Government took over operation of the Winnipeg Electric Company, thereby beginning the service of publicly-owned transit in Winnipeg. The purchase of WECo assets were officially completed on November 11 later that year. A 5% gross-revenue tax was replaced by a seat-mile tax in the amount of "one thirtieth cent per mile" (1/30¢ per mile (1/30¢ per 1.6 kilometre)).

Just as in other jurisdictions, there was proof that the oil industry conspired to get rid of the electric streetcars because it prevented more people from purchasing automobiles. Traffic engineers wanted access to the Canadian Pacific Railway (CPR) subway (at Higgins and Main) to allow for regular vehicular traffic as, up until September 19, two lanes were exclusively used for streetcar traffic. Soon enough, streetcars in Winnipeg saw their last day of operation on 18 September 1955. These last Street Cars were paraded on Main Street with the lead car painted with a crying face and the phrase "We've had it!" above the windows.

After dismantling the streetcar network, the GWTC created a mascot, Transit Tom, who made his advertisement debut in 1955, with the slogan “Take A Bus!”.

Limited stop bus service was introduced on the Portage route starting 4 November 1957. A five-cent premium fare was charged to passengers. By May 1960, GWTC had tweaked the Portage Express and added the Ness Express routes. Mylar signs using white text on a red background indicated to passengers the bus was Express rather than a local bus.

1961–69: Metro Winnipeg Transit 
On 1 January 1961, the Greater Winnipeg Transit Commission was reorganized as the Transit Department of the newly-established Metropolitan Corporation of Greater Winnipeg—dubbed Metro Winnipeg Transit (or Metro Transit)—and was managed by D. I. MacDonald. On the eve of this takeover, the GWTC suggested consideration of a rapid transit subway for Winnipeg, but agreed it would be premature to plan for immediate construction.

In 1962, as part of the new Metro administration, a metropolitan development plan began after taking several years to complete. The transportation component, referred to as the Winnipeg Area Transportation Study, whose recommendations were published in January 1969, called for five freeways, a suburban beltway, and a  underground subway. A report on transit was released in October that year, recommending to scrap the idea of a "downtown bus terminal" for Winnipeg Transit. It also recommended a price reduction of 50 cents for monthly passes.

On 1 January 1963, Metro Transit offered to purchase a fleet of 11 diesel buses for C$200,000 from White Ribbon Bus Lines, which served the City of Transcona. Also in early 1963, Metro Winnipeg Transit began to get rid of the Zone Fare system in some areas. Councillor Bernie Wolfe led a campaign against Zone Fares, saying that this extra fare encouraged carpooling in the Fort Garry area. Abolishing the Zone Fare would result in a loss of $130,000 annual revenue to the Transit Department.

Metro Winnipeg Transit phased out the trolleybus fleet throughout the 1960s. At one point, Winnipeg City Council begged Metro to stop this phase out, but it continued nonetheless. In 1965, electric coaches began to be replaced by diesel buses began. When service was expanded into new areas, overhead lines were taken down, after which diesel buses ran those lines. In April 1969, bus fares were raised from 15 cents to 25 cents. Also that year, the main transit garage was moved from Assiniboine Avenue to a new location on south Osborne Street.

Recent history (1970–present)

1970–73 
The last trolleybus in Winnipeg ran on 30 October 1970; the vehicle used is preserved.

As early as 1971, Dial-A-Bus was studied as a way to transport passengers from very low-density suburban neighbourhoods.

In August 1970, several River Heights residents opposed a jointly-managed Unibus shuttle service for students of the University of Manitoba. Riding Unibus would save students from paying the regular adult fare, instead having them pay $20 for six months' use. In December, however, a legal case was opened at the Manitoba Court of Queens Bench, filed by a Lindsay Street (River Heights) resident claiming that Metro Transit, under the 1960 Metropolitan Winnipeg Act, had no authority to operate the Unibus service. Residents were upset that the routes would depreciate housing where the buses traversed and that the service was only available to University students. In September 1971, 60 residents showed up to the last Metro Council meeting to protest the running of the Unibus service in the Riverview area, complaining of bus traffic on Balfour, Maplewood, and Casey streets.

Two weeks later, the City's civic election took place, replacing Metro Winnipeg with a Unicity government. Upon this municipal merger, public transit services became the responsibility of the newly unified City of Winnipeg on January 1, 1972, with Metro Transit becoming the City of Winnipeg Transit Department, or Winnipeg Transit.

At the behest of Metro, a summer-only shuttle service to Birds Hill Provincial Park, outside the city, was instituted on 21 May 1971, charging 75 cents for adults and 50 cents for seniors. However, Winnipeg Transit would go on to say that they were not making enough on the fares to pay for the shuttle, and ended the service on 3 September 1979.

1974–79 
Express bus service between downtown Winnipeg and King's Park commenced 17 February 1974, replacing the local bus service to that community.

In February 1975, the City began DASH (Downtown Area SHuttle; now Downtown Spirit), a free shuttle service operating on 5-minute headways, Mondays to Fridays between 9am and 4pm, throughout the Central Business District of downtown Winnipeg.

In early 1976, the union for Winnipeg Transit, Amalgamated Transit Union (ATU) 1505, had not signed a new contract. Workers went off the job starting 26 January 1976. Both the Mayor of Winnipeg and Premier of Manitoba were powerless in stopping the transit strike, which strike lasted for 47 days and ended after ratification by the ATU on March 12. Council voted 41-1 (out of a nominal 50 members) the day prior to agree to the new 17-month contract. Councillor Florence Pierce (ICEC - Glenlawn) was the only Councillor present who voted against the new contract. The effects of the strike left many people stranded or unable to travel to work or for medical appointments. The issues were mainly wage and work scheduling-related. The Board of Commissioners had stated that if the ATU wins a pay increase, certain routes may be cancelled and a 10 cent far implemented on the DASH route and Dial-A-Bus service to Saint Norbert & Fort Richmond cancelled. According to D. I. MacDonald: It may be necessary to review the level of transit service provided, due to the rapid escalation of transit costs, to the point where the transit deficit is now a major budget item.
In 1977, Winnipeg Handi-Transit began as a 2-year test project to provide parallel public transit service to those with limited physical mobility. Two years later, Handi-Transit was made a permanent feature of Winnipeg Transit’s operations.

Also in the late 1970s, Winnipeg Transit paid an outside design firm to create a new logo for the transit department, although it would not be until two or three years later when bus stops begun to feature the new design.

1980s–90s 
Winnipeg Transit installed a modern two-way radio system, capable of addressing a specific bus in 1982. The project received  $2.5 million from the City and $90,000 from the federal government.

In 1982, Winnipeg Transit refurbished 8 GM New Look buses that were originally built in the early 1960s rather than purchasing brand new buses. From 1984 onwards and for the next six years, Winnipeg Transit would refurbish 10 buses annually. When Edmonton and Calgary completed the first phase of their light rail (LRT) systems in the early 1980s, they found that they needed fewer diesel buses. They sold some of them to Winnipeg Transit, which in turn bought 10 double-rear-door Flyer models from Edmonton (380 series) at a cost of $20,000 each, and another nine9 GM New Look buses from Calgary (290 series) at a cost of $35,000 each. The Edmonton buses had red seats and featured double rear doors. The Edmonton buses were sold off by 1985.

In April 1982 the Works and Operations Committee awarded Mediacom, Inc. a contract to build and maintain 200 transit shelters with advertising for a period of 15 years.

During the week of 23 September 1982, Winnipeg Transit tested a GM-built articulated bus on the Portage and Pembina routes. The bus, numbered 900, was constructed from parts of a GM New Look with a Classic front end. It was destined to operate as part of the Mississauga Transit fleet.

Winnipeg Transit purchased 20 electronic fareboxes from GFI in 1985 at the cost of C$7,000 each to eliminate theft of dollar bills by bus operators. However, the boxes were incompatible with the one dollar loonie coin introduced in 1987 and were then removed from service.

During the summer of 1985 all bus stops in Winnipeg were replaced with new ones bearing a telephone number that started with 235-. When a transit passenger called this number he/she would hear a computerized female voice give the current time, and the transit routes and times those routes passed through that particular stop. Telebus, which is based on software by Teleride Corporation, was officially launched in February 1986. Costs were shared 50-50 between the Province and City to pay the $1.3 million to set up the original system. However, in 1987 all bus stop decals were replaced with the 287- telephone exchange.

After Calgary Transit's C-Train LRT expanded into the Northeast in April 1985, 30 brand new Flyer buses (600-630 series) were sold to Winnipeg and put into service in 1986. Calgary Transit had offered to sell 30 "slightly used" GM New Look buses to Winnipeg Transit, but the Province pressured the City to purchase the Flyer buses to support the provincially-owned Flyer Industries as a local manufacturer. Building new buses cost the City $5.4 million, $1.5 million more than it would have cost to purchase the "slightly used" Calgary vehicles.

On 31 December 1992, transit services to Headingley were withdrawn.

After several years delay, the Graham Avenue Transit Mall was completed over a two-year period (1994–95) at a cost of $5.7 million.

Winnipeg Transit bought its first low-floor accessible bus in 1994. Also that year, the Winnipeg Free Press conducted a downtown idea contest, which Jeff Lowe won with an idea for a rail-based streetcar to serve the downtown Winnipeg area. Subsequently, this idea was added to the CentrePlan report; the CentrePlan formed a "downtown connector" committee, of which a representative from Winnipeg Transit participated.

Since June 1995, Winnipeg Transit allowed non-directional transfers, which were initially set for a 90-minute period. When the electronic fareboxes were introduced in 2013, the transfer time was reduced to 75 minutes, making it somewhat difficult to accomplish errands that are further away or take up more time. Beginning in September 1995, Winnipeg Transit designated Main Street, between Higgins Avenue and Graham, as a bus-only lane during peak hours (7-9 am, 15h30-17h30 weekdays).

The Pan American Games were hosted by Winnipeg in the summer of 1999, and in order to provide transportation to athletes, volunteers, media, and spectators, Winnipeg Transit increased its fleet to 665 buses.

Also in 1999, the Downtown BIZ had put forward a request for a feasibility study on a streetcar connector for downtown; however, this did not happen until 2002. The subsequent report, which was never released, was very soft on recommending any form of connector service.

2000–10 
In September 2000, a new transit route concept was introduced, the SuperExpress. The idea behind the SuperExpress is to shuttle passengers who live in the outer suburbs (closer to the Perimeter Hwy.) faster than the normal Express routes. This was based on how the NYC MTA Bus system is organized. Originally introduced as the 61 University SuperExpress, it has since been extended to other routes, such as 25 Ness SuperExpress, 36 NorthWest SuperExpress.

In the early 21st century, the three levels of government made a deal to fund the development of three infrastructure projects:

 the Kenaston Underpass, which was completed in the fall of 2006;
 funding for expansion of the Floodway, which was completed in 2010; and
 Phase I of the Southwest Transit Corridor, which was completed in 2019

Since then, Winnipeg Transit has devised a more detailed winter snow plan, with three phases:

 In the first phase (the "Blue Snow Plan"), most suburban and short-trip routes (including DART service) would not operate, and most other routes would operate on shortened or simplified routes.
 In the second phase (the "Red Snow Plan"), transit service would be reduced to 13 routes running along major arterial roads and serving downtown, major hospitals, and the airport.
 In the third phase, transit would cease to operate completely.

, Winnipeg Transit has not had to implement the snow plan.

On November 16, 2007, the federal, provincial, and municipal governments announced the Transit Improvement Program, which included upgrades and improvements to existing infrastructure for buses, such as transit priority signals, transit-only lanes, and new bus shelters. In addition to an order of 33 new regular  low-floor buses, Winnipeg Transit also ordered twenty new  articulated Diesel-Electric Hybrid buses; the first bus was delivered by the end of 2007. The test of the first articulated bus was not successful, and that part of the order was cancelled.

In 2008, Winnipeg Transit added the "next stop" program, wherein the upcoming bus stop on a route is announced by a computerized female voice, as well as the street name being shown on a small display on the ceiling at the front of the bus. The display would also show whether a stop has been requested by a passenger. The program was preceded by a phase where transit operators called out stops, which led to debate over whether this would distract drivers from the road.

As of 2009, Telebus operates through one telephone number: 287-7433 (or BUS-RIDE). Users can access information about buses stopping at a specific bus stop by entering the five-digit code located on the sign for that stop. The first number of the stop designates the municipal area the stop is located in (1 for the old City of Winnipeg, 5 for St. Boniface and St. Vital, etc.).

In 2010, installation of bicycle racks on buses was revived. (This was preceded by earlier trials on Route 18 in 1999, and on Route 60 from 2000 to 2004 or 2006.) Thirty buses that are used on Routes 160, 162, and 170 now have two-place bike racks installed during summer months, between May 1 and October 31. However, as of 2017, some transit users have been frustrated that the program is not dependable. Beginning in spring 2018, buses with bike racks were made identifiable on Navigo, Winnipeg Transit's online scheduling system.

On 8 April 2012, Winnipeg officially opened the Southwest Transitway, as well as introducing Rapid Transit (RT) to the City.

In 2012, Winnipeg Transit purchased twenty 2003/2004-era New Flyer buses (sized ) from OC Transpo for $53,000 each. After refurbishment between 2012 and 2014, Winnipeg Transit began operating some of these buses, starting with the 54 St. Mary's and 59 South St. Anne's express routes on 13 January 2014.

In July 2016, Winnipeg Transit introduced the Peggo electronic fare payment system, designed to replace paper tickets and passes. This new reloadable electronic fare card featured an embedded microchip that communicates with the on-board farebox.

In a report released in June 2019 it was estimated to cost Winnipeg Transit $2.4 million annually to extend the free fare for children aged birth to 11 (currently age 5).

2019 
A June 2019 Leger survey commissioned by the Canadian Urban Transit Association found that in Winnipeg alone, one in three survey respondents "think public transit is poorly developed in their area" and that more than half found "transit infrastructure in their community is outdated."

Since late October 2019, Winnipeg Transit Inspectors have worn protective vests, to protect themselves if there are confrontations with passengers or others nearby.

Contract negotiations 
From January 2019 to the fall of that year, Amalgamated Transit Union (ATU) workers at Winnipeg Transit were without a contract. During the spring and summer there were two days of "free" transit where bus operators did not enforce fares. There were four votes on contracts, all of them voted down. The ATU said that while they did not want to go on strike (as in 1976), they might be forced to do so. Issues this time centered around safety issues since the murder of Irvine Fraser on 14 February 2017.

In mid-September, University of Manitoba Students' Union expressed their support for the transit union's issues, but feared that a major transit strike would cause undue hardship on students as the University of Manitoba is Winnipeg Transit's second most important trip attractor, besides downtown Winnipeg.

A new 48-month contract was voted on, with 52% in favour of accepting the current offer. It was subsequently approved by EPC on October 17, and passed by Council one week later on October 24. The new contract increased wages 1.25% (2020), 2% (2021), 1.75% (2022), and 2% (2023).

Transit Master Plan

In May 2017, transit planner Jarrett Walker was invited by advocacy group Functional Transit Winnipeg to speak in Winnipeg on the topic of a Frequent Transit Network. Jarrett travels to various cities to promote frequent transit as a priority over coverage.

Recently, Winnipeg Transit received funding to redesign its transit system for the next quarter century. Called the Transit Master Plan (TMP), public consultations took place in March and April 2019, with "Draft Route Plans" released in October 2019.

The TMP came about because many passengers feel that many WT routes do not go where people need to go (work, school, shopping). Other issues involve:

 Buses that do not operate frequently enough when people need the service such as late at night or on weekends. 
Passengers experience buses that are early, late, don't show up at all (phantom buses).
Overcrowding is a problem on several routes. To help alleviate this issue, WT ordered 28 New Flyer  buses, with delivery in 2019. These buses will be used on the BLUE BRT route, which begun in April 2020.
Peggo, the electronic fare card system introduced in 2016, has been plagued by software glitches.
Adult fares ($3.00 cash, $102.05 monthly) are considered high for those who are underemployed or unemployed. A Low Income Fare & Pass policy is currently being considered for implementation for the Spring of 2020.
Winnipeg Transit does not serve communities beyond the Perimeter Hwy (with the exception of St. Norbert). These include Headingley, Oakbank, East St. Paul, and Niverville. The Transit Master Plan will examine how to serve these and other communities in the Winnipeg Metro Region.

The TMP process is designed to address the above issues.

Part of the Transit Master Plan may address the issue of serving communities beyond the Perimeter Highway. In March 2019 the RM of Rosser urged Winnipeg Transit to extend its service between the RM and the growing CentrePort employment area. Since then a wider study that is part of an updated Transportation Master Plan will examine ways extending service to exurban communities and introduce Park & Ride facilities on major thoroughfares near the Perimeter Hwy.

A "Public Engagement Report" was published in July summarizing feedback from March and April 2019. On October 25, 2019 the Phase II Draft report of the Transit Master Plan was released. It shows a total redesign of transit routes, many of them operating in a straight line, some no longer operating within the downtown Winnipeg area, some others on other roads. For example, routes 'A' (SW Transitway-Portage), 'B' (Main-St. Mary's), and 'C' (Grant-Regent) are designated rapid transit. The 55 St. Anne's would no longer travel west beyond the Univ. of Winnipeg, and would not travel south on Main St. and St. Mary's Rd. which already duplicates the 14 St. Mary's route. Instead a route 'G' (St. Anne's-Univ. of Winnipeg) would continue eastward over the Provencher Bridge to Rue Des Meurons and head south till it meets with St. Anne's Rd.

Funding for the $2.6 million Transit Master Plan comes from the federally administered Public Transit Infrastructure Fund.

Services and programs 
Since 1975, the City has been operating the Downtown Spirit (formerly Downtown Area SHuttle, or DASH), a free shuttle service operating weekdays throughout the Central Business District of downtown Winnipeg.

Winnipeg Handi-Transit, introduced as a permanent service of Winnipeg Transit in 1979, provides parallel public transit service to those with limited physical mobility.

Rapid Transit

In response to an expressway plan published in 1957 that was sponsored by the Downtown Winnipeg Association, a city councillor sponsored the hiring of Norman D. Wilson to design a subway plan for the greater Winnipeg area. This plan was published on 11 April 1959 as the Future Development of the Greater Winnipeg Transit System.

In the late 1960s, as part of the Greater Winnipeg Development Plan, the Winnipeg Area Transportation Study (WATS) recommended a  underground subway line between Queen St. in St. James to Hespeler Avenue in Elmwood.

Winnipeg Transit's official policy since 1973 has been to promote Bus Rapid Transit as the mode of choice for the Southwest Transit Corridor.

By the mid-2000s, Mayor Sam Katz had wanted to move the rapid transit situation forward. He commissioned several studies: Rapid Transit Task Force (2005), Transportation Authority Study (2009), LRT Conversion Study (2009–10), Winnipeg Transportation Strategy (2010).

On April 8, 2012, service on Phase one of Winnipeg's bus rapid transit line; the Southwest Transitway began. All RT routes terminate at Balmoral Station in Downtown Winnipeg (Except Route 185), next to the University of Winnipeg. RT routes then run along the Graham Avenue Transit Mall to Main Street, then south down Queen Elizabeth Way to Stradbrook Avenue where buses enter the  Southwest Transitway and travel southwest.

There are four stations on the Southwest Transitway; Harkness Station, Osborne Station, Fort Rouge Station, and Jubilee Station.

Buses enter/exit the Southwest Transitway either just past Osborne Station or the Jubilee Overpass and continue to their final destinations in South Winnipeg, the University of Manitoba or Investors Group Field. The Cost of Phase one was 138 million dollars.

Phase Two will see the Southwest Transitway extended south from the Jubilee Overpass to Bison Drive just west of the University of Manitoba. The cost for the second phase is around 408 million dollars. Construction is underway, with completion and initial operation beginning April 8, 2020.

Winnipeg Transit also is looking at other corridors for the city including the East Corridor to Transcona, as well as a proposed West Corridor, along Portage Avenue to Polo Park, with a spur line to the airport.

During the Summer of 2018, road inspections deemed it necessary to repave parts of the SWBRT, a mere six years after the opening of Phase I. The repaving project cost $700,000.

Phase 2 of the Southwest Transitway was scheduled to open April 8, 2020.

Routes

As of September 2020, Winnipeg Transit operates 87 routes, of which:

 22 are express (Express & SuperExpress) routes
 13 are Feeder routes running on the Southwest Transitway
 18 are regular routes connecting the city centre with the suburbs
 17 are suburban feeders
 13 are crosstown routes
 3 are dial-a-ride transit (DART) routes.

Winnipeg Transit operates accessible buses on all routes.

Most routes serving downtown have an official route name as well as number, and are usually named based upon the main streets on which they travel. (The exceptions are the Routes 53 and 56, which connect downtown with the northern section of St. Boniface). Some routes travel in two directions from downtown, each direction carrying the same number but different signage. Some routes' ultimate destinations also vary from trip to trip, and carry secondary signage to designate the specific sub-route. For instance, the route 16 Osborne (southbound) may have one of five different ultimate destinations depending on the time of day, day of the week, and intended route: two of these destinations (St. Vital Centre and Kingston Row) are in St. Vital, two (Southdale Centre and Island Lakes) are in St. Boniface, and one (Plaza Drive) is in Fort Garry.

Feeder routes are numbered in the 600 series, with the exception of routes 47, 65, and 66, which do not operate on the entire busway. Most routes operate to Downtown at the Balmoral Station, while some operate to a terminal at Rupert and Princess or Osborne Village. Some RT routes are express routes after they exit the Southwest Transitway when travelling outbound, while others operate as regular routes.

Most express routes also have official route names and connect downtown with either the suburbs or the industrial areas. Suburban express routes normally operate inbound in the morning and outbound in the afternoon, weekdays only, while routes connecting downtown with industrial areas operate as required. Suburban routes do not enter the downtown core. They are scheduled according to customer demand; some only run during rush hour, while some run whenever transit is operating.

Many routes that do not have official names still may display signage. Route 53 has no official name but buses on the route use the signage "Norwood".

The DART routes serve communities in south Winnipeg. Three DART routes replace regular transit service to neighbourhoods (Riel/Plaza Drive, St. Norbert, and Southdale/Island Lakes) during times when demand for transit service is insufficient to justify running a regular bus route, while one DART route provides daytime service to residents of the northern section of St. Boniface.

Special event shuttles 

During the Red River Ex annually in the month of June, Winnipeg Transit operates a shuttle between downtown Winnipeg and the Red River Exhibition grounds.

When the Winnipeg Blue Bombers are playing at Investors Group Field during the summer and early fall months, Winnipeg Transit operates several shuttle buses to and from the stadium. These routes are labeled with an X before the route number, and have a destination of "IG FIELD" (example: "X60 IG FIELD").

For many decades Winnipeg Transit operated a shuttle bus between Winnipeg and Birds Hill Provincial Park for the annual Winnipeg Folk Festival held in July. However, they did not do this for the 2019 Folk Festival due to the possible strike by the ATU, and because Winnipeg Transit did not win the competitive bid to provide this service. In 2020 and 2021, the Folk Festival was cancelled entirely. In 2022, the Folk Festival finally returned, and Winnipeg Transit provided the service to Birds Hill for the first time in 4 years.

Peggo 
Winnipeg Transit introduced the Peggo electronic fare payment system in July 2016. This was designed to replace paper tickets and passes. However, the software used to update the balance on the cards has been problematic, sometimes causing the withdrawal of thousands of dollars from a passenger's credit card.

Winnipeg Transit planned to install wifi on twelve buses as a trial to commence in March 2018. The purpose of adding wifi to buses is for quicker updates of passengers' Peggo cards. Currently, Peggo data is updated overnight while buses are in their garage. This has led to fare dispute issues for some passengers who loaded their cards online.

Low Income Pass Program 
The Low Income Pass Program was approved 14 to 1 by Council at a special meeting on 24 October 2019, with North Kildonan Councillor Jeff Browaty voting against the idea. To qualify for the lower income monthly transit pass, one must be a client of EIA, have income lower than the income cut-off, or be an immigrant that has resided in Winnipeg for less than 12 months. In its first year, the low income Adult pass will cost $70.70. Passengers will have to apply beginning April 2020 for the first passes to be issued in May.

WT currently sells 29,500 monthly passes. Lower costs for a pass will increase (estimated) sales to 78,000 by 2024, putting an extra strain on transit buses as more passengers ride the system. Additional buses may be required to handle the extra load.

Navigo 
To facilitate use of the system, Winnipeg Transit's website provides a service called Navigo which allows users to specify a starting location and destination (either by address, Winnipeg landmark, or intersection) and the desired time of arrival or departure (specified as "before" or "after"). It then produces all the available bus routes that meet the criteria, estimating how much time is spent walking to bus stops and waiting for buses, as well as how many transfers are required to arrive at the destination.

Pass-Ups 
Since July 2019, Winnipeg Transit has been providing data on pass-ups on all bus routes. A pass-up is when a bus is too full to accept any more passengers. This is part of the City's open data initiative. Recent data showed that these 5 routes have the highest number of pass-ups, between September and December 2022: BLUE, 75 Crosstown East, 11 Portage-Kildonan, 60 Pembina, and 47 Transcona-Pembina.

Operations

There are about 5,200 Winnipeg Transit bus stops, 800 bus shelters, and 1,500 transit benches. Larger bus stops and stations often include electronic signage, called "BUSwatch" signs. These signs provide live info on upcoming bus departures.

Fleet
Winnipeg Transit has a fleet of approximately 630 low-floor buses, supplied by New Flyer Industries. The fleet includes:

In late 2018, it was announced that Winnipeg Transit was in the process of receiving twenty-eight  articulated buses (numbered 371-398) from New Flyer that would be delivered in the latter half of 2019.

Winnipeg Transit has a fleet of historic buses that have been restored by the Manitoba Transit Heritage Association.

Facilities

Major bus terminals 

Rapid Transit Stations (see also Winnipeg RT)

In popular culture

The song "Civil Twilight", by Winnipeg rock band The Weakerthans from their 2007 album Reunion Tour, is sung from the point of view of a Winnipeg Transit driver whose route passes the house where he lived with his former significant other before the failure of their relationship.

See also

 Graham Avenue Transit Mall
 List of Winnipeg bus routes
 Transport in Winnipeg
 List of Winnipeg City Routes
 Winnipeg Area Transportation Study
 Southwest Transitway
 Winnipeg Bus Terminal
 Winnipeg RT

References

Notes

Sources
 Baker, John E. (1982). Winnipeg's Electric Transit: The Story of Winnipeg's Streetcars and Trolley Busses. West Hill, Ontario: Railfare.  .
 Darragh, Brian K. (2015). The Streetcars of Winnipeg: Our Forgotten Heritage. Victoria, BC: Friesen Press.

External links
 
 Winnipeg Transit
 Transit Improvement Program Press Rel. (November 16, 2007) (archived PDF)
 Transit Rider Union of Winnipeg
 Functional Transit Winnipeg
 Winnipeg Transit - Transit Master Plan
 All Time List of Canadian Transit Systems - Transit History of Winnipeg, Manitoba
 Winnipeg trolley buses
 Transit Improvements

 
1882 establishments in Manitoba
Transport in Winnipeg
Transit agencies in Manitoba
Bus transport in Manitoba